Armand Frédéric Estang (10 December 1886 – 16 May 1956) was a French athlete. He competed in the high jump at the 1912 Summer Olympics, but was unable to clear his starting height of 1.70 m.

References

Sportspeople from Agen
1886 births
1956 deaths
French male high jumpers
Olympic athletes of France
Athletes (track and field) at the 1912 Summer Olympics
20th-century French people